Joseph Goebbels (1897–1945) was the Propaganda Minister of Nazi Germany.

Goebbels may also refer to:

 Goebbels (surname), other persons named Goebbels
 Goebbels Diaries, a 29-volume edition of the diaries of Joseph Goebbels
 Goebbels und Geduldig, a 2002 German war comedy film
 Goebbels Schnauze, German slang for a type of radio receiver
 Goebbels cabinet

See also 
 Goebel (disambiguation)
 Ronald Goebbel (born 1936), American politician